T. M. Giasuddin Ahmed ( – 4 July 2020) was a politician of Shariatpur District of Bangladesh and former member of Parliament for Shariatpur-2.

Career
Ahmed was a former minister and president of Shariatpur district Bangladesh Nationalist Party. Before that he was elected to parliament from Shariatpur-2 as a Jatiya Party candidate in 1986 and 1988.

Death 
Giasuddin Ahmed died on 4 July 2020 from COVID-19, during the COVID-19 pandemic in Bangladesh.

References 

1937 births
2020 deaths
People from Shariatpur District
Bangladesh Nationalist Party politicians
Jatiya Party politicians
3rd Jatiya Sangsad members
4th Jatiya Sangsad members
Deaths from the COVID-19 pandemic in Bangladesh